Sušak may refer to several places:

 Sušak, Rijeka, Croatia
 Sušak, Slovenia, a village in the Municipality of Ilirska Bistrica in Slovenia